Dugommier is a station of the Paris Métro on Line 6 in the 12th arrondissement.

History
The station opened on 1 March 1909 with the opening of the original section of Line 6 from Place d'Italie to Nation (although part of Line 5—some dating back to 2 October 1900—was incorporated into Line 6 on 12 October 1942). Its initial name of Charenton was due to its proximity to the same named street, which originally led to the commune of Charenton-le-Pont. On 12 July 1939, which was renamed after Jacques François Dugommier (1738–1794), a general and member of the Convention, which governed France, 1792–1795. It was the location of the Barrière de Charenton, a gate built for the collection of taxation as part of the Wall of the Farmers-General; the gate was built between 1784 and 1788 and demolished during the 19th century.

As part of RATP's Renouveau du Métro programme, the station corridors and platform lighting were renovated by 29 November 2002. In 2021, attendance is gradually rising, with 1,725,412 passengers entering this station, placing it in the 204th position of metro stations for its usage.

Passenger services

Access
The station has a single access called Boulevard de Reuilly, consisting of a fixed staircase decorated with a mast with a yellow M inscribed in a circle and a Dervaux-type balustrade, leading to the right of no.1 of this boulevard.

Station layout

Platforms
Dugommier is a station of standard configuration. It has two platforms separated by the metro tracks and the vault is elliptical. The decoration is of the style used for most metro stations. The lighting strips are white and rounded in the Gaudin style of the metro revival of the 2000s, and the bevelled white ceramic tiles cover the walls and tunnel exits. The vault is coated and painted white. The advertising frames are metallic, and the name of the station is inscribed in Parisine font on enamelled plates. The seats are Motte style and green. The stairs leading to the platforms are tiled, as well as the perimeter of the platforms and the floor under the seats.

Bus connections
The station is served by lines 71, 77, 87 and 215 of the RATP Bus Network.

Nearby

Gallery

References

Paris Métro stations in the 12th arrondissement of Paris
Railway stations in France opened in 1909